Lucas Eatwell (born 24 July 1987), better known by his ring name , is an English professional wrestler. He is currently signed to New Japan Pro-Wrestling (NJPW), where he is a member of The Mighty Don't Kneel stable, and is the current and inaugural NJPW World Television Champion in his first reign. From 2017, Sabre Jr was a part of the Suzuki-gun stable, until its disbandment in 2022. Outside NJPW, Sabre performs for Pro Wrestling Guerrilla (PWG), Ring of Honor (ROH), Revolution Pro Wrestling (RPW), and Progress Wrestling (Progress).

Sabre is a former NWA United Kingdom Junior Heavyweight Championship winner and a product of the NWA-UK Hammerlock training school. He started training with NWA-UK Hammerlock at the age of 14, under the guidance of Jon Ryan and Andre Baker. Sabre's offensive moveset includes a wide array of intricately complex technical wrestling holds and pinning combinations, harsh strikes (stemming from his love of puroresu), explosive athleticism and dazzling acrobatics. The readers of the Wrestling Observer Newsletter voted Sabre the Best Technical Wrestler of the year for seven consecutive years (2014–2020) and was voted Best Technical Wrestler of the Decade (2010s).

Though primarily known for his solo performances, Sabre is also a tag team wrestler. In his early career, he made a name for himself as part of the "Leaders Of The New School" with Marty Scurll, holding the IPW:UK Tag Team Championships twice. He would later win the same title (now called RPW Undisputed British Tag Team Champions) alongside Suzuki-gun stablemate Minoru Suzuki. In Pro Wrestling Noah, he was a two-time GHC Junior Heavyweight Tag Team Champion with Yoshinari Ogawa and, in World Xtreme Wrestling, a wXw World Tag Team Champion with Big Daddy Walter. Sabre has also formed a tag team with other Suzuki-Gun stablemate Taichi (the "Dangerous Tekkers"), who are three time IWGP Tag Team Champions.

In NJPW, Sabre has won the New Japan Cup twice in 2018 and 2022. In PWG, he is a former PWG World Champion, and the winner of its 2015 Battle of Los Angeles.

Early life
Lucas Eatwell was born on the Isle of Sheppey on 24 July 1987.

Professional wrestling career

NWA UK Hammerlock (2005–2007)
On 22 October 2005, Sabre won the NWA United Kingdom Junior Heavyweight Championship and held the title until 1 June 2008 when it was vacated.

International Pro Wrestling: United Kingdom (2006–2012)
At International Pro Wrestling: United Kingdom (IPW:UK), Sabre most notably won the IPW:UK Tag Team Championship twice along with Marty Scurll in 2009 and 2010.

Pro Wrestling Noah (2008–2015)
At Pro Wrestling Noah (Noah), Sabre most notably won the GHC Junior Heavyweight Tag Team Championship twice with Yoshinari Ogawa in 2013 and 2014.

Westside Xtreme Wrestling (2006–2018)
At Westside Xtreme Wrestling (wXw), Sabre won both the wXw World Lightweight Championship and the wXw World Heavyweight Championship in 2010 unifying the titles to become the inaugural wXw Unified World Wrestling Champion. He lost the championship in the same year to Big van Walter. Sabre also won the 2015 World Tag Team Tournament for the vacant wXw World Tag Team Championship together with Big Daddy Walter.

Progress Wrestling (2012–2018)

Sabre appeared for London-based Progress Wrestling (Progress) on their debut show, in a losing effort to Marty Scurll, in a match voted UK Match of the Year by Alternative Wrestling Magazine, and was lauded by critics.

In 2015, Sabre took part in the first ever Progress Wrestling Super Strong Style 16 tournament, competing in four matches over the weekend – defeating Zack Gibson, Tommaso Ciampa and Scurll before losing to Will Ospreay in the final. Sabre had a rematch with Ciampa in November at the first ever Manchester Progress show, which Ciampa won. In March 2016, Sabre and Ciampa teamed up to face The Origin (El Ligero and Nathan Cruz) for the Progress Tag Team Championships but failed to capture the titles. Following the loss, Ciampa beat down Sabre. The two faced each other at Progress' biggest show to date, held at the Brixton Academy in London, in a Two Out of Three falls match which Sabre Jr won.
At Chapter 40, Sabre unsuccessful challenge Pete Dunne for the Progress World Championship. He then entered to Super Strong Style 16 defeating David Starr in the first round, Jack Sexsmith in the second by losing to Travis Banks in the semi-final. Sabre entered to the Super Strong Style 16 2018, defeating Chuck Mambo in the first round, David Starr in the second round, Keith Lee in the semi final and Kassius Ohno in the final, thus winning the tournament for the first time in his career. At Chapter 77, Sabre was defeated by WALTER for the Progress World Championship.

Pro Wrestling Guerrilla (2014–2018)

Sabre made his debut for Pro Wrestling Guerrilla (PWG) at the 2014 Battle of Los Angeles on night 1 teaming with Chuck Taylor and Kenny Omega and defeating Adam Cole and The Young Bucks (Matt and Nick Jackson).

In April 2015, he returned to the promotion, answering the challenge from PWG World Champion Roderick Strong in a title match at Don't Sweat the Technique in a losing effort. He then entered the 2015 Battle of Los Angeles which he eventually won.

On Night 2 of All Star Weekend 12, Sabre defeated Strong to win the PWG title for the first time. He entered his third Battle of Los Angeles tournament in September 2016, losing to Will Ospreay in the quarterfinals. On 7 July 2017, Sabre lost the PWG World Championship to Chuck Taylor. In September, Sabre entered the 2017 Battle of Los Angeles tournament, where he was eliminated by Rey Fenix in the quarter finals.

WWE (2016)
On 31 March 2016, Sabre was announced as a participant in WWE's upcoming Global Cruiserweight Series tournament, which was later renamed the "Cruiserweight Classic". His name was taken down shortly after as he would have a qualifying match at Progress Wrestling's Chapter 29 event in London to earn his spot, where he defeated Flash Morgan Webster. On 23 June, Sabre defeated Tyson Dux in his first round match. On 14 July, Sabre defeated Drew Gulak in his second round match. On 26 August, Sabre defeated Noam Dar to advance to the semifinals of the tournament, where he was defeated on 14 September by Gran Metalik. Afterwards, it was reported that Sabre's loss was due to him not agreeing to a contract with WWE unlike the two tournament finalists.

New Japan Pro-Wrestling (2017–present)

Suzuki-gun (2017–2022)
On 21 February 2017, it was announced that Sabre would be making his debut for New Japan Pro-Wrestling (NJPW) at the promotion's 45th anniversary show on 6 March, where he would challenge Katsuyori Shibata for the RPW British Heavyweight Championship. Sabre won the match with help from Minoru Suzuki and Davey Boy Smith Jr., joining the Suzuki-gun stable in the process. The following day, Sabre pinned NEVER Openweight Champion Hirooki Goto in an eight-man tag team match. This led to Sabre unsuccessfully challenging Goto for the title on 9 April at Sakura Genesis. Sabre was left out of the 2017 Best of the Super Juniors as NJPW had decided to categorise him as a heavyweight wrestler going forward. Instead, he was announced for NJPW's premier singles tournament, the 2017 G1 Climax. Prior to the G1 Climax, Sabre took part in a tournament to crown the inaugural IWGP United States Heavyweight Championship at G1 Special in USA, where he made it to the semifinals, before losing to Tomohiro Ishii. On 17 July, Sabre scored a major win in his first G1 Climax match by submitting the reigning IWGP Intercontinental Champion Hiroshi Tanahashi. Sabre went on to finish the tournament with a record of five wins and four losses, failing to advance to the finals. On 16 September at Destruction in Hiroshima, Sabre failed in his attempt to capture the Intercontinental Championship from Tanahashi.

On 28 February 2018, Sabre was announced as one of the competitors in the 2018 New Japan Cup. Sabre defeated Tetsuya Naito in the first round, Kota Ibushi in the second round and Sanada in the semi-finals, on his way to the final. On 21 March, Sabre defeated Tanahashi in the final, becoming the second gaijin to win the tournament after Giant Bernard in 2006. After the match, he challenged IWGP Heavyweight Champion Kazuchika Okada for a title shot at Sakura Genesis. On 1 April at Sakura Genesis, Okada defeated Sabre to retain the title. Zack Sabre Jr. competed in the 2018 G1 Climax where he finished with 12 points, failing to advance due to his losses against Kenny Omega & Kota Ibushi.

At Wrestle Kingdom 13 he defeated Tomohiro Ishii to regain the British Heavyweight Championship. In March 2019, Sabre entered to the 2019 New Japan Cup, defeating Evil in the first round, Kota Ibushi in the second round but losing to Hiroshi Tanahashi in the quarter final. At G1 Supercard, Sabre defeated Hiroshi Tanahashi to retain the RPW British Heavyweight Championship. Sabre was announced as a participant of the 2019 G1 Climax. He walked away with 8 points after winning four matches, beating Bad Luck Fale, Will Ospreay, fellow Suzuki Gun stablemate Lance Archer, and Kenta, whilst suffering losses to Kazuchika Okada, Sanada, Hiroshi Tanahashi, Kota Ibushi, and Evil. At Royal Quest, Sabre lost the British Heavyweight Championship to Hiroshi Tanahashi. At Destruction in Beppu, Sabre pinned Tanahashi to regain the RPW British Heavyweight Championship for the fourth time.

After retaining against Sanada, at Wrestle Kingdom 14, and Will Ospreay, at The New Beginning in Sapporo, Sabre lost the title to Ospreay on 14 February at an RPW event. Since then, he has started teaming up with fellow Suzuki Gun stablemate Taichi in pursuit of the Golden Aces' (Kota Ibushi and Hiroshi Tanahashi) IWGP Tag Team Championships. In the 2020 New Japan Cup, Sabre was eliminated in the first round by Ibushi. His partner Taichi, however, eliminated both Tanahashi and Ibushi from the tournament before being eliminated himself by Sanada. On 12 July, at Dominion, Sabre and Taichi defeated Tanahashi and Ibushi to win their IWGP Tag Team Championships, marking Sabre's first title win in NJPW. They retained the championship in a match against the former champions at Summer Struggle in Jingu. After one more successful defense, they lost the titles to G.O.D. at Wrestle Kingdom 15. However on June 1, he and Taichi regained the IWGP Tag Team Championship. They would lose them to World Tag League winners Hirooki Goto and YOSHI-HASHI at Wrestle Kingdom 16 Night 1. On Night 2, Suzuki-gun lost to Los Ingobernables de Japon, in an 8-man tag team match. On Night 3, Sabre Jr and fellow Suzuki-gun stablemate Yoshinobu Kanemaru lost to Pro Wrestling NOAH's Naomichi Marufuji and Yoshinari Ogawa.

In March, Sabre Jr participated in the New Japan Cup, he defeated Ryohei Oiwa in the first round and fellow Suzuki-Gun stablemate Douki in the second round. He defeated, Great-O-Khan in round 3 and Will Ospreay in the quarter finals, in a critically acclaimed match. Sabre Jr then defeated, Shingo Takagi in the semi-finals to advance to the finals, where he defeated Tetsuya Naito, in the tournament finals, to win his second New Japan Cup. Due to winning the tournament, Sabre Jr earned an IWGP World Heavyweight Championship match. At Hyper Battle, Sabre Jr lost to World Champion Kazuchika Okada. 

At Dominion 6.12 in Osaka-jo Hall, Sabre Jr teamed with Kanemaru and El Desperado to challenge for the NEVER Openweight 6-Man Tag Team Championship in a losing effort to House of Torture. Also at the event, Sabre Jr was announced to be competing in the G1 Climax 32 tournament in June, as a part of the C Block. In the tournament, Sabre Jr finished with 8 points, with only a loss to Tetsuya Naito on the final day, costing him a spot in the semi-finals.

In October, Sabre Jr competed in a tournament to crown the inaugural NJPW World Television Champion. He defeated Alex Zayne in round one and David Finlay in round 2. The following month, Sabre Jr defeated Evil to advance to the tournament finals, where he faces Ren Narita at Wrestle Kingdom 17.

In December 2022, at the World Tag League & Best of the Super Juniors finals, Minoru Suzuki announced the disbandment of Suzuki-gun by the end of the year. The final match between the faction took place on December 23, where the team of Taichi, Sabre Jr, Kanemaru and Douki defeated Suzuki, Archer, Desperado and Michinoku. After the match, each of the Suzuki-gun members spoke about their memories as a part of the group and thanked leader Suzuki. The night ended with all members posing with the Suzuki-gun flag, only to be interrupted by former member Takashi Iizuka, causing all 9 men to pose in the ring, behind the Suzuki-gun flag, which was raised by Michinoku.

Inaugural NJPW World Television Champion and The Mighty Don't Kneel (2023–present) 
At Wrestle Kingdom 17, Sabre Jr. defeated Ren Narita to become the inaugural NJPW World Television Champion. After the match, Sabre Jr was approached by Mikey Nicholls and Shane Haste, who offered him a TMDK t-shirt. Sabre Jr accepted the shirt and embraced the two men, joining the stable. Sabre Jr made his first title defence, successfully defeating Tomohiro Ishii in February. On February 18, at Battle in the Valley, Sabre Jr made his first title defence in the US, defeating Clark Connors to retain the title once again.

Ring of Honor (2018–2019, 2023)
On 5 November 2018, it was announced that Sabre would make his Ring of Honor (ROH) debut at Final Battle 2018. He defeated Jonathan Gresham.

Sabre Jr returned to ROH on February 25, 2023, on the first episode of Ring of Honor, since Tony Khan's purchase of the company. At the event, he successfully defended the NJPW World Television Championship against Blake Christian.

All Elite Wrestling (2022)
Since the announcement of AEW x NJPW: Forbidden Door, Sabre Jr had consistently called out "The American Dragon", hinting to challenging Bryan Danielson to a match at Forbidden Door. This led to, on the June 22 edition of Dynamite, Danielson acknowledging Sabre Jr's challenge, however he also announced that he was injured and not medically cleared to compete at Forbidden Door, due to his loss at Double or Nothing in the Anarchy in the Arena match. However, Danielson announced a mystery opponent for Sabre Jr, who he claimed was the "one person" he trusted to take his place at the PPV and at the subsequent special episode of Dynamite, AEW Blood and Guts. This led to Sabre Jr, making his AEW debut by staring down Danielson. On June 26 at the event, the mystery opponent was revealed to be Claudio Castagnoli, who defeated Sabre Jr.

Personal life
Eatwell became a vegan in 2015.

Professional wrestling style and persona
Sabre's technical style primarily involves British catch wrestling and submission holds. He has won the Wrestling Observer Newsletter Bryan Danielson Award (Best Technical Wrestler)' for seven consecutive years. Sabre is a member of the TMDK faction.

Championships and accomplishments
Alternative Wrestling Magazine
 UK Match of the Year (2012) vs. Marty Scurll on 25 March 
AM Wrestling
One Night Tournament (2008)
DDT Pro-Wrestling
Ironman Heavymetalweight Championship (1 time)
Defiant Wrestling/What Culture Pro Wrestling
Defiant/WCPW Internet Championship (1 time)
 Evolve
 Evolve Championship (1 time)
German Stampede Wrestling
GSW Breakthrough Championship (1 time)
International Pro Wrestling: United Kingdom
IPW:UK Tag Team Championship (2 times) – with Marty Scurll
UK Super 8 Tournament (2014)
Tag Team Tournament (2017) – with Jimmy Havoc
New Japan Pro-Wrestling
NJPW World Television Championship (1 time - inaugural, current)
IWGP  Tag Team Championship (3 times) – with Taichi
New Japan Cup (2018, 2022)
NWA-UK Hammerlock
NWA United Kingdom Junior Heavyweight Championship (1 time)
Hardcore Lottery Tournament (2008)
Premier Promotions
PWF Middleweight Championship (1 time)
PWF Light Heavyweight Championship (1 time)
Ian Dowland Trophy (2010)
Ken Joyce Trophy (2011)
Worthing Trophy (2012, 2013)
Pro Wrestling Guerrilla
PWG World Championship (1 time)
Battle of Los Angeles (2015)
Pro Wrestling Illustrated
Ranked No. 24 of the top 500 singles wrestlers in the PWI 500 in 2018
 Ranked No. 3 of the top 50 Tag Teams in the PWI Tag Team 50 in 2021 – 
Pro Wrestling Noah
GHC Junior Heavyweight Tag Team Championship (2 times) – with Yoshinari Ogawa
Progress Wrestling
Super Strong Style 16 (2018)
Revolution Pro Wrestling
British Heavyweight Championship (4 times)
Undisputed British Tag Team Championship (3 times) – with Marty Scurll (2) and Minoru Suzuki (1)
Solent Wrestling Federation
One Night Tournament (2012)
Tokyo Sports
Best Tag Team Award (2021) 
Triple X Wrestling
Triple X Wrestling Heavyweight Championship (1 time)
Westside Xtreme Wrestling
wXw World Heavyweight Championship (1 time)
wXw World Lightweight Championship (1 time)1
wXw World Tag Team Championship (1 time) – with Big Daddy Walter
Ambition 4 (2013)
16 Carat Gold Tournament (2016)
wXw World Tag Team Tournament (2015) – with Big Daddy Walter
WhatCulture Pro Wrestling
Pro Wrestling World Cup English Qualifying (2017)
Wrestling Observer Newsletter
Bryan Danielson Award (Best Technical Wrestler) (2014–2020)
Best Technical Wrestler of the Decade (2010s)

Notes

References

External links

WWE Cruiserweight Classic profile

1987 births
Expatriate professional wrestlers in Japan
Living people
English male professional wrestlers
People from the Isle of Sheppey
Suzuki-gun members
Wrestling Observer Newsletter award winners
21st-century professional wrestlers
IWGP Heavyweight Tag Team Champions
PWG World Champions
GHC Junior Heavyweight Tag Team Champions
Ironman Heavymetalweight Champions
Undisputed British Heavyweight Champions
Undisputed British Tag Team Champions